Milford is an incorporated rural community located in North Central Texas, in the southwestern corner of Ellis County, in the United States. The population was 722 at the 2020 census.

The community received media attention due to a Chevron gas pipeline explosion and resulting town evacuation which occurred in 2013.

History

Settlement and early history
Milford dates back to the 1850s, when several men from Cherokee County came to the Mill Creek valley and bought land at 50 cents an acre from Ellis County landowner Arvin Wright. Milford was named by William R. Hudson after the factory town of Milford, Massachusetts. During 1853 the first house, a combined residence and general store belonging to William R. Hudson, was built, along with a two-story schoolhouse which served as church and community hall until it burned during the Civil War. In 1854 Wright, Hudson, and J.M. Higgins laid out town lots atop a ridge. In 1857, a gristmill began operation at the community. Milford was incorporated in 1888, with W.R. McDaniel serving as the first mayor. In 1890, the tracks of the Dallas and Waco Railway (later acquired by the Missouri–Kansas–Texas Railroad) reached the community, which became an important shipping point for area cotton farmers.

By 1892 Milford had grown to a population of 800, and had three churches, a bank, a hotel, two cotton gins, and approximately two dozen other businesses, as well as a weekly newspaper. There were now two schools in Milford, Mollie Poe's private Lone Star Institute and the community-financed Milford Academy. In 1902 the Presbyterian Synod of Texas accepted the town's offer to open the Texas Presbyterian College for Girls in Milford, and by 1925 the Dallas-Waco electric interurban railway had reached the town. The town continued to flourish, with the population soaring to 1,200 by 1929, but the population saw a slow decline due to the Great Depression, and the Presbyterian college closed due to lagging enrollment. By 1931 the population of Milford was 747, and would continue to decline as the population reached a low of 490 in 1968. The town would grow once again, and by 1990 the population was back up to 711, before dropping to 685 in 2000.

2013 gas pipeline explosion

Explosion and fire
Just after 8:30AM CDT on November 14, 2013, an explosion and resulting fire occurred near the intersection of U.S. 77 and FM 308 when a Chevron Corporation liquefied petroleum gas pipeline was punctured by a Chevron drilling crew. The five man crew abandoned the rig and escaped the explosion unharmed.

Aftermath
Due to concerns about harmful air quality conditions due to the burning pipeline, and the proximity of the fire to another larger gas line, the entire town of approximately 700 residents was forced to evacuate, including Milford ISD staff and students, to the nearby town of Italy as a  evacuation zone was established.

While some residents were permitted to return to the town temporarily under police escort, the town remained evacuated through November 16 as the pipeline continued to burn. The fire also caused the postponement of a six-man football playoff game scheduled for November 15 as the players could not retrieve their gear.

Chevron response
The company issued several statements through their website expressing their sincere regret to people impacted by this event which included a toll-free claims hotline which residents affected by the incident could call. The company also provided overnight accommodations at local hotels for residents due to conditions not allowing them to return home.

Geography

Milford is located at  (32.122701, –96.946553).

U.S. Route 77 passes through the center of town as Main Street, while Interstate 35E runs along the northern edge of town, with access from Exit 381.

Demographics

As of the 2020 United States census, there were 722 people, 296 households, and 217 families residing in the town.

Education

The town is served by the Milford Independent School District and is home to the Milford High School Bulldogs.

From 1902–1929, the town was home to the Texas Presbyterian College for Girls. Milford gave the school  of land and $25,000 to assist in its founding. It was later expanded to  before closing in 1929 and merging with Austin College in Sherman, Texas.

In pop culture
Milford is the setting of the 2015 sci-fi, action comedy film Lazer Team. This movie was the first feature-length film ever created by a company founded, and located in Texas called Rooster Teeth. The movie was entirely crowd funded and was given a PG-13 rating. In this movie, the Milford High School mascot is the Mustangs rather than the Bulldogs. And the school colors are red and white rather than the blue, gray and white.

Milford is also the setting of the 2016 independent comedy and LGBT film "Hurricane Bianca" starring actor and drag superstar "Bianca Del Rio" (Roy Haylock).

Photo gallery

References

External links
 City of Milford official website

Dallas–Fort Worth metroplex
Towns in Ellis County, Texas
Towns in Texas